Kalnica  is a village in the administrative district of Gmina Cisna, within Lesko County, Subcarpathian Voivodeship, in south-eastern Poland, close to the border with Slovakia.

The village has a population of 142.

References

Kalnica